"Summer Colors" is a song written by Joseph Meyer and Curtis Mann and performed by Wayne Newton.  It reached #20 on the U.S. adult contemporary chart in 1967.  It was featured on his 1968 album, Somewhere My Love.

The song was arranged by Jimmie Haskell.

References

1967 songs
1967 singles
Songs written by Joseph Meyer (songwriter)
Wayne Newton songs
Capitol Records singles